The Battle of Olney Bridge was a skirmish that occurred on 4 November 1643 during the First English Civil War just outside the town of Olney, Buckinghamshire. In the engagement, Royalist forces attacked Parliamentarian forces holding the Olney bridge, but were driven off by a counter-attack.

Legacy
The Olney bridge where the battle took place remains in place, along with a memorial to the dead.

References

Battles of the English Civil Wars
1643 in England
Military history of Buckinghamshire
Conflicts in 1643
17th century in Buckinghamshire